Saint-Paul-de-Vence (literally Saint-Paul of Vence;) is a commune in the Alpes-Maritimes department in the Provence-Alpes-Côte d'Azur region of Southeastern France. One of the oldest medieval towns on the French Riviera, it is well known for its modern and contemporary art museums and galleries such as the Fondation Maeght, and for the 17-century Saint Charles-Saint Claude chapel, which in 2012–2013 was decorated with murals by French artist Paul Conte.

Until 2011, the commune was officially called Saint-Paul.

Notable people
Saint-Paul-de-Vence has long been a haven of the famous, mostly due to the La Colombe d'Or hotel, whose former guests include Jean-Paul Sartre and Pablo Picasso. During the 1960s, the village was frequented by French actors Yves Montand, Simone Signoret and Lino Ventura, and poet Jacques Prévert.

Saint-Paul is also well known for the artists who have lived there, such as Jacques Raverat, Gwen Raverat and Marc Chagall and more recently the couple Bernard-Henri Lévy and Arielle Dombasle. Former Rolling Stones bassist Bill Wyman has a home there. American writer James Baldwin lived in Saint-Paul-de-Vence for 17 years until his death in 1987. British actor Donald Pleasence lived there until his death in 1995.

Xanthi FC player Vincenzo Rennella was born in Saint-Paul-de-Vence. Actress and artist Rebecca Dayan was raised in a hotel there.

American comic actors Gene Wilder and Gilda Radner were married in Saint-Paul-de-Vence by its mayor on September 18, 1984.

See also
Communes of the Alpes-Maritimes department

References

External links
The Official website of Saint Paul de Vence
Virtual tour of Saint-Paul de Vence

Communes of Alpes-Maritimes